Ronald Thomas Shepherd OBE (1896 – 1 March 1955) was a British aviator and test pilot for Rolls-Royce. He was the first person to fly an aircraft powered by the Rolls-Royce Merlin aero-engine.

Early life
Shepherd was born in Kensington, London in 1896 the son of Thomas and Agnes Shepherd, his father was a lithographic printer.

Aviator
At first he was employed by Vickers-Armstrongs in the manufacturer of guns but on the outbreak of the First World War he joined the Honourable Artillery Company. Shepherd joined the Royal Flying Corps in 1916 where he flew with 102 Squadron and 37 Squadron. He left the RFC in 1918 but re-joined in 1921 where he served in England and Egypt until 1929.

Test pilot
After a few years as a civil flying instructor he joined Rolls-Royce in 1931. In 1935 he was appointed chief test pilot. Shepherd was responsible for the first flight of many of the companies engines, including the Merlin, Kestrel and Griffon piston engines and the Nene and Avon jet engines.

After a serious illness in 1951 he relinquished his chief test pilot role and became a flying consultant. Although no longer flying full-time and aged 58 he made the first free flight of the unusual Rolls-Royce Thrust Measuring Rig a pioneering vertical take-off and landing aircraft on 3 July 1953.

He was appointed an Officer of the Order of the British Empire in 1946 for his work as a test pilot and in particularly the development of the Merlin. He died on 1 March 1955 at his home at Nuthall.

References

1896 births
1955 deaths
English test pilots
English aviators
Officers of the Order of the British Empire
People from Kensington
Royal Air Force officers
Royal Flying Corps officers